Francis Marshall Ward (26 December 1830 - 5 April 1914) was a bass singer, composer and musician who flourished mainly in Lincolnshire and Nottinghamshire.

Life
He was born on 26 December 1830, the son of Francis Ward (b. 1796) and Jessey Marshall (1796-1946). He was baptised on 24 January 1831 at St Michael’s Church, Lincoln. He was educated as a chorister in Lincoln Cathedral.

On 19 April 1853 he married Mary Hannah East in St Swithin's Church, Lincoln and they had the following children
Harry Marshall Ward (1854-1906)
Elizabeth East Ward (b. 1855)
Jessie Mary Ward (b. 1857)
Tom Edgar Ernest Ward (1858-1901)
Frank Sydney Ward (b. 1860)
Lily M Ward (b. 1864)
Nellie Ward (b. 1866)

In 1886 he was appointed conductor of the Philharmonic Choir for the Liverpool Exhibition.

He died on 5 April 1914 at his home, 98 Melton Road, West Bridgford, Nottingham, and on 9 April was buried in the General Cemetery in Nottingham.

Organist Appointments
St Peter’s Church, Lincoln 1845-1851
Priory Church of St Mary, Abergavenny 1855-1857
St Mary le Wigford Lincoln 1857 - ????
Holy Trinity Church, Lenton, Nottingham 1865 - 1867
St James' Church, Standard Hill, Nottingham 1867 - ????
Broad Street Wesleyan Church, Nottingham 1894 - ????

Compositions
His compositions included settings of church services, anthems, songs and part songs, notably “Great and Marvellous”, “I have set the Lord always before me” and “I will give thanks”.

References

1830 births
1914 deaths
English organists
British male organists
English composers
19th-century British composers
19th-century English musicians
People from Lincoln, England
19th-century British male musicians